Larry Clinton (August 17, 1909  –  May 2, 1985) was an American musician, best known as a trumpeter who became a prominent American bandleader and arranger.

Biography
Clinton was born in Brooklyn, New York, United States. He became a versatile musician, playing trumpet, trombone, and clarinet. While in his twenties, he became a prolific arranger for dance orchestras; bandleaders Tommy Dorsey, Jimmy Dorsey, Glen Gray, Louis Armstrong, and Bunny Berigan all used Larry Clinton charts.

His first stint as a bandleader was from 1937 to 1941, and he recorded a string of hits for Victor Records. The Clinton band's repertoire was split between pop tunes of the day ("I Double Dare You", "Summer Souvenirs", "Deep Purple"), ambitious instrumentals penned by Clinton like "Satan Takes a Holiday" (recorded by Tommy Dorsey) and the most popular, "A Study in Brown", which begat four sequels in different "colors", and swing adaptations of classical compositions. This last category swept the industry, and orchestras everywhere were "swinging the classics" by adding pop lyrics to melodies by Debussy and Tchaikovsky. His arrangement and adaptation of Debussy's "Reverie", with vocalist Bea Wain, was particularly popular. Entitled "My Reverie", his version peaked at No. 1 on Billboard's Record Buying Guide in 1938. "Abba Dabba" was based on Tchaikovsky's Arabian Dance from The Nutcracker.

He was the first to record and release the standard "Heart and Soul" featuring Bea Wain on vocals in 1939. The single reached no. 1.

Appearances in film
Clinton's band was predominantly a recording group that also played college proms and hotel ballrooms. On the strength of Clinton's record hit "The Dipsy Doodle", Vitaphone and Paramount Pictures, signed the band to star in three 10-minute theatrical films. All were filmed in New York.

In 1941, Clinton and his band appeared in six short musical films, designed for then-popular "movie jukeboxes". (The films were ultimately released as Soundies in 1943.) This was one of his last jobs as a bandleader; he quit the music business upon the outbreak of World War II, and joined the United States Army Air Forces. A rated pilot, he rose to the rank of captain, was stationed with the Air Transport Command in Calcutta and China during Hump airlift, and was a flight instructor with the 1343rd Base Unit.

He resumed his musical career and enjoyed further success as a bandleader from 1948 to 1950. He remained active in the music business—often leading a studio band for pop singers such as Barry Frank—until 1961.

Radio
In 1938, Clinton had his own program, The Larry Clinton Show on NBC.

Death
Clinton died in 1985 in Tucson, Arizona, at the age of 75.

References

External links
 Larry Clinton recordings at the Discography of American Historical Recordings.

1909 births
1985 deaths
American bandleaders
American jazz trumpeters
American male trumpeters
Big band bandleaders
Bell Records artists
Jubilee Records artists
Musicians from Brooklyn
Musicians from Tucson, Arizona
United States Army Air Forces officers
United States Army Air Forces pilots of World War II
20th-century American musicians
20th-century trumpeters
Jazz musicians from New York (state)
20th-century American male musicians
American male jazz musicians